Commerzbank Tower is a 56-story,  skyscraper owned by Samsung of Korea since September 2016 in the banking district of Frankfurt, Germany. It is the tallest building in Frankfurt and the tallest building in Germany. It had been the tallest building in Europe from its completion in 1997 until 2003 when it was surpassed by the Triumph-Palace in Moscow. Since the departure of the United Kingdom from the European Union, the tower had briefly reclaimed its position as the tallest building in the European Union only to lose the title again in 2021 when Poland's Varso Tower topped out. The Commerzbank Tower is only two metres taller than the Messeturm, which is also located in Frankfurt and was the tallest building in Europe before the construction of the Commerzbank Tower.

Commerzbank Tower was designed by Foster & Partners, with Arup and Krebs & Kiefer (structural engineering), J. Roger Preston with P&A Petterson Ahrens (mechanical engineering), Schad & Hölzel (electrical engineering). Construction of the building began in 1994 and took three years to complete. The building provides  of office space for the Commerzbank headquarters, including winter gardens and natural lighting and air circulation. The building is lighted at night with a yellow lighting scheme that was designed by Thomas Ende who was allowed to display this sequence as a result of a competition.

In its immediate neighbourhood are other skyscrapers including the Eurotower (former home of the European Central Bank), the Main Tower, the Silberturm, the Japan Center and the Gallileo. The area forms Frankfurt's central business district, commonly known as Bankenviertel.

Features 

When the building was planned in the early 1990s, Frankfurt's Green Party, who governed the city together with the Social Democratic Party, encouraged the Commerzbank to design a 'green' skyscraper. The result was the world's first so-called ecological skyscraper: besides the use of 'sky-gardens', environmentally friendly technologies were employed to reduce energy required for heating and cooling.

Sky gardens
At nine different levels, the atrium opens up to one of the three sides, forming large sky gardens. These open areas allow more natural light in the building, reducing the need for artificial lighting. At the same time it ensures offices in the building's two other sides have a view of either the city or the garden.

In order to eliminate the need of supporting columns in the sky gardens, the building was constructed in steel rather than the conventional (and cheaper) concrete. It was the first skyscraper in Germany where steel was used as the main construction material.

In popular culture

Commerzbank Tower appears under the name Hurt Enterprise Headquarters as a vanilla stage 8 Euro-Contemporary building set in SimCity 4 (Deluxe or with Rush Hour).
In 2007, Wrebbit released a 3D puzzle from the Towers Made To Scale Collection, which includes Commerzbank Tower and Messeturm in one box-set.
In his 2011 book Boomerang, Michael Lewis describes a meeting with a German financier who claimed the top of the Commerzbank Tower contains a glass room that serves as a men's toilet from which, he joked, one could, "in full view of the world below, [void one's bowels] on Deutsche Bank."

Gallery

Skyscrapers in Frankfurt

See also
 List of tallest buildings in Frankfurt
 List of tallest buildings in Germany
 List of tallest buildings in the European Union
 List of skyscrapers

References

Citations

Books

External links

 

Foster and Partners buildings
Office buildings completed in 1997
Skyscrapers in Frankfurt
Bankenviertel
Skyscraper office buildings in Germany
1997 establishments in Germany
Commerzbank